Doszhan Kartikov (born 24 May 1989) is a Greco-Roman wrestler from Kazakhstan.

Kartikov earned a bronze medal at the 2014 Asian Games in Men's Greco-Roman 75 kg. Kartikov earned a bronze medal at the 2015 World Wrestling Championships in Men's Greco-Roman 75 kg.

He has also won the Dave Schultz Memorial tournament.

References

External links
 

Living people
Kazakhstani male sport wrestlers
Asian Games medalists in wrestling
Wrestlers at the 2014 Asian Games
Wrestlers at the 2016 Summer Olympics
Olympic wrestlers of Kazakhstan
Asian Games bronze medalists for Kazakhstan
Medalists at the 2014 Asian Games
21st-century Kazakhstani people
1989 births